Skumparp is a neighbourhood of Malmö, situated in the Borough of Limhamn-Bunkeflo, Malmö Municipality, Skåne County, Sweden. It is also a locality and had 205 inhabitants in 2010.

References

Neighbourhoods of Malmö
Populated places in Malmö Municipality
Populated places in Skåne County